The Theban Triad is a triad of Egyptian gods most popular in the area of Thebes, Egypt.

The triad
The group consisted of Amun, his consort Mut and their son Khonsu.

They were favored by both the 18th and 25th Dynasty. At the vast Karnak Temple Complex, these gods constituted the primary objects of worship. Other temples and shrines also exist throughout Egypt, such as the one at Deir el-Hagar, close to the Dakhla Oasis. Amenhotep I, the pharaoh who built Karnak, was often depicted amongst these gods.

References

 
Thebes, Egypt
Groups of Egyptian deities
Egyptian gods
Amun
Triple deities